James Herbert McGraw (December 17, 1860 in Harmony, New York – February 21, 1948) was co-founder of what is now McGraw-Hill Education. He was the president of McGraw-Hill from 1917 to 1928. The McGraw Publishing Company and the Hill Publishing Company merged their book departments in 1909.

References 
Harvard Business School: Bio: James H. McGraw

1860 births
1948 deaths
People from Harmony, New York
Burials at Evergreen Cemetery (Morristown, New Jersey)
American company founders